United Nations Security Council resolution 610, adopted unanimously on 16 March 1988, after reaffirming resolutions 503 (1982), 525 (1982), 533 (1983) and 547 (1984) expressing concern at the imposed death sentences of anti-apartheid activists, the Council noted the deteriorating situation in South Africa. Resolution 610 concerned the Sharpeville Six, accused of the murder of the Deputy Mayor of Sharpeville on 12 December 1985.

The resolution expressed deep concern at the decision of the "Pretoria regime" to execute the Sharpeville Six on 18 March 1988 despite worldwide appeal, noting that the court proceedings showed that none of the six suspects was found to have killed the Councillor, but all were only convicted as they had a "common purpose" with the actual perpetrators.

Resolution 610 urged the Government of South Africa to commute the sentences and stay execution, urging other Member States, acting in accordance with the United Nations Charter, to save the lives of the six people. The following day after the resolution was adopted, a one-month stay of execution was granted by a South African Court, and the six appealed.

See also
 Internal resistance to apartheid
 List of United Nations Security Council Resolutions 601 to 700 (1987–1991)
 Apartheid
 United Nations Security Council Resolution 615

References

External links
 
Text of the Resolution at undocs.org

 0610
1988 in South Africa
 0610
March 1988 events